Los Enanitos Verdes is the first album of Los Enanitos Verdes, released in 1984.

Track listing 

 La nena de diecisiete [The Seventeen-Year-Old Girl]
 La miraba de atrás [I Saw Her From Behind]
 Comiendo en el plato del perro [Eating From The Dog Dish]
 Detrás de las ruinas [Behind The Ruins]
 Aún sigo cantando [I'm Still Singing]
 No se metan más [Do Not Mess With Ne]
 Gente incoherente [Incoherent People]
 Cambiá, volvé [Change, And Come Back]
 Show del calabozo [Show Of The Dungeon]
 Amor callejero [Street Love]
 Tengo un sueño en mi alma [I Have A Dream In My Soul]

1984 debut albums
Enanitos Verdes albums